Igor Makitan (born 12 October 1994) is a Bosnian professional footballer who plays as a defender for South African Premier Division club TS Galaxy.

References

External links

1994 births
Living people
Bosnia and Herzegovina footballers
Association football defenders
FK Kozara Gradiška players
FK Krupa players
TS Galaxy F.C. players
Premier League of Bosnia and Herzegovina players
South African Premier Division players
Bosnia and Herzegovina expatriate footballers
Bosnia and Herzegovina expatriate sportspeople in South Africa
Expatriate soccer players in South Africa